Auriscalpium villipes is a species of fungus in the family Auriscalpiaceae of the Russulales order. It is a spine fungus that grows on dead wood, and is found in South America (Brazil) and Mexico.

References

External links

Fungi of North America
Fungi of Brazil
Russulales
Taxa named by Curtis Gates Lloyd
Fungi described in 1918